Leopold Agbazo (born 25 January 1945) is a Beninese boxer. He competed in the 1972 Summer Olympics.

1972 Olympic results
Below is the record of Leopold Agbazo, a Beninese bantamweight boxer who competed at the 1972 Munich Olympics:

 Round of 64: lost to Abdelaziz Hammi (Tunisia) by decision, 0-5

References

1945 births
Living people
Boxers at the 1972 Summer Olympics
Beninese male boxers
Olympic boxers of Benin
Bantamweight boxers